Hajipour is a surname of Iranian origin. Notable people with the surname include:

Afshin Hajipour (born 1975), Iranian footballer
Ali Hajipour, Iranian taekwondo practitioner
Shervin Hajipour (born 1997), Iranian singer-songwriter
Sousan Hajipour (born 1990), Iranian taekwondo practitioner

Surnames of Iranian origin